Cisthene coronado is a moth of the family Erebidae first described by Carroll B. Knowlton in 1967. It is found in the US state of Arizona.

References

Cisthenina
Moths described in 1967